Best Kept Secret is the second solo album by Boot Camp Clik member, Louieville Sluggah. It was released by Chambermusik Records in 2010.

Track listing
 Intro
 On Top of the World
 Roll wit a Boss  (featuring Ba'E Boii Zeek)
 Brooklyn (featuring Coco, F.O.U.L., and Steele)
 Can't Get Out (featuring F.O.U.L. and Spazz)
 Changing (featuring Naja)
 Everything I Touch (featuring F.O.U.L.)
 Girl (featuring Isha Hollins)
 Guide You
 Sonado by Tea Time featuring Louieville Sluggah
 Tell You Somethings (featuring F.O.U.L.)
 Addicted by Willy Dutch featuring Louieville Sluggah

References

2010 albums
Louieville Sluggah albums